Mulla Mulla is a rural locality in Hay Shire Council and a civil parish of Nicholson County in New South Wales, and is located at

Geography
The parish, located 750 km (460 mi) from Sydney on the Lachlan River, is flat, semi-arid and the main economic activity is agriculture. There are no towns in the parish though the town and river crossing of Booligal, New South Wales is nearby to the south west.

References

Populated places in New South Wales